Derby Island is a small rocky island close north of Astrolabe Glacier Tongue, lying  southwest of Pasteur Island at the southern end of the Dumoulin Islands. It was photographed from the air by U.S. Navy Operation Highjump, 1946–47, charted by the French Antarctic Expedition, 1949–51, and so named because French field parties competed against each other for the honor of being first to reach the island area.

See also 
 List of Antarctic and sub-Antarctic islands

References

Islands of Adélie Land